Janq'u K'ark'a (Aymara janq'u white, k'ark'a crevice, fissure, crack, "white crevice", also  spelled Jankho Karka, Janq'u Karka) is a mountain in the Cordillera Real in the Andes of Bolivia, about  high. It is situated in the La Paz Department, Larecaja Province, Guanay Municipality, and in the Murillo Province, La Paz Municipality. Janq'u K'ark'a lies north-east of the mountain Kunturiri.

References 

Mountains of La Paz Department (Bolivia)